Callipero is a genus of beetles in the family Cerambycidae, containing the following species:

 Callipero bella Bates, 1864
 Callipero formosa Monné, 1998

References

Acanthocinini